Elisabetta Perut Bozzolo (born 25 February 1970) is a Chilean journalist, film director, producer, and screenwriter best known for the documentaries Un hombre aparte and . Both of these were made in collaboration with Iván Osnovikoff, a director with whom she has done most of her audiovisual work in the documentary field.

Career
Most of Perut's filmography has been made with Osnovikoff. Her first work was Chi-chi-chi-le-le-le. Martín Vargas de Chile in 2000, which won Best Film at the Valparaíso Film Festival and Best Research at the Santiago Documentary Festival in 2001. This was followed by Un hombre aparte (2001) – which won the jury prize for Best Experimental Documentary at the Havana Film Festival – El Astuto Mono Pinochet Contra La Moneda de los Cerdos (2004), and Welcome to New York (2006), the latter of which was nominated for a Pedro Sienna Award for Best Short and Documentary Short Film. In 2009, Noticias was released, winning Best Experimental Documentary at the Parnü IDF in Estonia.  (2011) received a special award from the Santiago International Film Festival jury.

In addition, Perut has won three Altazor Awards: two in 2002 in the categories Best Direction and Best Creative Contribution, and one in 2007 for Best Direction in Documentary Film. She received a nomination in the same category in 2012.

Filmography

Awards and nominations

References

External links
 
 

1970 births
Chilean documentary filmmakers
Chilean film directors
Chilean journalists
Chilean women film directors
Chilean women journalists
Film directors from Rome
Italian emigrants to Chile
Living people
Women documentary filmmakers